Union Church and Cemetery is a historic Episcopal church and cemetery located at Falmouth, Stafford County, Virginia.  The property contains the archaeological sites of the 1733 and 1750s Falmouth Anglican churches and the standing remains of the Union Church, built about 1819.  The Union Church narthex, measuring 10 feet by 40 feet, is the section remaining from the Federal style building.  The building contains an original stairway to the balcony and framing that extends upward to form the belfry which supports an estimated 300-pound bell.  Also on the property is the church cemetery with headstones, dating from the 18th and the early 19th centuries through the 20th century. A violent rain storm in 1950 severely damaged the roof of the 40 feet wide by 54 feet long church leading to a collapse of the chancel and nave, leaving only the narthex intact.

It was listed on the National Register of Historic Places in 2008.

References

External links
 Union Church Preservation Project
Union Church (Facade), Carter Street, Falmouth, Stafford County, VA: 2 photos at Historic American Buildings Survey

Historic American Buildings Survey in Virginia
19th-century Episcopal church buildings
Episcopal churches in Virginia
Churches on the National Register of Historic Places in Virginia
Federal architecture in Virginia
Churches completed in 1819
National Register of Historic Places in Stafford County, Virginia
Churches in Stafford County, Virginia